During World War II, the United States Army Air Forces (USAAF) established numerous airfields in South Dakota for training pilots and aircrews of USAAF fighters and bombers.

Most of these airfields were under the command of Second Air Force or the Army Air Forces Training Command (AAFTC) (A predecessor of the current-day United States Air Force Air Education and Training Command).  However the other USAAF support commands (Air Technical Service Command (ATSC); Air Transport Command (ATC) or Troop Carrier Command) commanded a significant number of airfields in a support roles.

It is still possible to find remnants of these wartime airfields. Many were converted into municipal airports, some were returned to agriculture and several were retained as United States Air Force installations and were front-line bases during the Cold War. Hundreds of the temporary buildings that were used survive today, and are being used for other purposes.

Major Airfields 
Air Technical Service Command
 Mitchell AAF/MAP, Mitchell
 353d Army Air Force Base Unit (Det)
 Now: Mitchell Municipal Airport 
 Pierre AAF, Pierre
 353d Army Air Force Base Unit (Det)
 Now: Pierre Regional Airport 

Second Air Force
 Rapid City AAB, Rapid City
 353d Army Air Force Base Unit
 Was: Rapid City Air Field (1947)
 Was: Weaver Air Force Base (1948)
 Was: Rapid City Air Force Base (1948-1953)
 Now:  Ellsworth Air Force Base (1953-Present)

 Sioux Falls AAF, Sioux Falls
 335th Army Air Force Base Unit
 Now: Sioux Falls Regional Airport / Joe Foss Field 
 And:  Joe Foss Field Air National Guard Station

Personnel Distribution Command
 Watertown AAF, Watertown
 353d Army Air Force Base Unit (Det)
 Now: Watertown Regional Airport 

Army Air Force Training Command
 Aberdeen AAF, Aberdeen
 Contract Flying School
 Now: Aberdeen Regional Airport

References
 Maurer, Maurer (1983). Air Force Combat Units Of World War II. Maxwell AFB, Alabama: Office of Air Force History. .
 Ravenstein, Charles A. (1984). Air Force Combat Wings Lineage and Honors Histories 1947-1977. Maxwell AFB, Alabama: Office of Air Force History. .
 Thole, Lou (1999), Forgotten Fields of America : World War II Bases and Training, Then and Now - Vol. 2.  Pictorial Histories Pub . 
 Military Airfields in World War II - South Dakota

External links

 01
World War II
World War II
World War II
South Dakota
South Dakota